Major Label is an alternative rock band from Helsinki, Finland.

Discography
 "Promo 2002" (demo) (2002)
 "Looking for Someone" / "Sweet Volunteer" (demo) (2003)
 Down the Sunny Road EP (2003)
 Hold Breath Between Lines EP (2004)
 Weightlifter EP (2005)
 "My Time" (single) (2007)
 ...And the Machines Will Never Wake Us (2007)
 When I Am with You You Are Safe (2009)

Members
 Arto Tuunela – vocals, guitar
 Tero Saraperä – bass guitar
 Ilari Kivelä – drum kit, sampler (2005–present)

References

External links
 Official website

Musical groups from Helsinki
Finnish alternative rock groups
Alternative metal musical groups